EA-2054 is an extremely toxic organophosphate nerve agent. It is an extremely potent acetylcholinesterase inhibitor that is resistant to atropine and oxime treatment.

See also
Nerve agent
EA-2012
EA-2098
EA-2613

References

Organophosphate nerve agents
Acetylcholinesterase inhibitors
Quaternary ammonium compounds
Phenol ethers
Phenol esters
Phosphonate esters
Isopropyl esters
Tetraphenylborates